Komanija is a small settlement south of Dobrova in the Municipality of Dobrova–Polhov Gradec in the Upper Carniola region of Slovenia.

Geography
Komanija lies along the local road from Razori to Brezovica pri Ljubljani. The core of the village stands in a shady position on a broad terrace above a plain, and it extends up the slope of Gradišča Hill to the west and down to Horjulščica Creek (a.k.a. Horjulka Creek, a tributary of the Gradaščica) to the east.

Notable people
Notable people that were born or lived in Komanija include:
Josip Marinko (1848–1921), editor and journalist

References

External links

Komanija on Geopedia

Populated places in the Municipality of Dobrova-Polhov Gradec